2011 FAM League is the 59th edition season of current third-tier league competition in Malaysia.

The league winner for 2011 season is Betaria FC.

Teams 
The following teams participated in the 2011 Malaysia FAM League. In order by the number given by FAM:-

 1 Malacca FA (Relegated from 2010 Malaysia Premier League)
 2 Tentera Darat FC ( New Team )
 3 Rapid KL FC ( New Team )
 4 TUDM Hornet FC ( New Team )
 5 UiTM FC
 6 KL SPA FC
 7 Melodi Jaya Sports Club
 8 MBJB FC
 9 Kor RAMD FC ( New Team )
10 Shahzan Muda FC (Relegated from 2010 Malaysia Premier League)
11 Negeri Sembilan Betaria FC ( New Team )

Withdrawn Teams

  Juara Ban Hoe Leong FC
  KSK Tambun Tulang FC

League table

References

External links
 FAM Cup 2011 at MalaysianSuperLeague.com
 Football Association of Malaysia

2011
3